The 2022 Strade Bianche Donne was an Italian road cycling one-day race that took place on 5 March 2022. It was the 8th edition of Strade Bianche Donne and the first event of the 2022 UCI Women's World Tour. The usual first race of the season, the Cadel Evans Great Ocean Road Race in Australia was cancelled due to the COVID-19 pandemic. It was won by the Belgian national champion Lotte Kopecky.

Route
The race starts and finishes in Siena, Italy. The route is identical to that of the previous years, containing 30 km of 'strade bianche gravel roads spread over eight sectors, for a total distance of 136 km. The final kilometre in Siena to the finish line in the Piazza del Campo has an maximum gradient of 16%.

Teams
Fourteen UCI Women's WorldTeams and eleven UCI Women's Continental Teams make up the twenty-five teams that will compete in the race.UCI Women's WorldTeams 
 
 
 
 
 
 
 
 
 
 
 
 
 UCI Women's Continental Teams'''

 
 
 
 
 
 
 
 
 
 Team Mendelspeck
 

Summary
After a variety of attacks from riders throughout the '' gravel tracks, a small group of twelve riders made it to the foot of the final climb in Siena - with 3 of those riders belonging to SD Worx. On the final climb on the Via Santa Caterina up to the finish, Lotte Kopecky of SD Worx was the only rider able to keep up with Annemiek van Vleuten of Movistar Team. However, at the top of the climb, Kopecky was able to outsprint van Vleuten for the win. Ashleigh Moolman Pasio of SD Worx was third, 10 seconds behind. After the race, Kopecky lauded the work of her SD Worx teammates.

Result

References

External links
 

Strade Bianche
Strade Bianche
Strade Bianche
Strade Bianche Women